Tigran Petrosyants (born 23 December 1973) is an Armenian football coach and a former midfielder. He is the manager of Ararat-Armenia II.

International career
He was a member of the Armenia national team and participated in 8 international matches.

External links

1973 births
Living people
Footballers from Yerevan
Armenian footballers
Armenia international footballers
Armenian expatriate footballers
PFC CSKA Moscow players
FC Zhemchuzhina Sochi players
FC Torpedo Moscow players
PFC Krylia Sovetov Samara players
FC Elista players
FC Chernomorets Novorossiysk players
Expatriate footballers in Russia
Armenian expatriate sportspeople in Russia
Russian Premier League players
FC Volgar Astrakhan players
Association football midfielders
Armenian football managers